Marek Zub (born 24 August 1964) is a Polish football manager and former player.

Honours

Manager

Žalgiris Vilnius
 A Lyga: 2013, 2014
 Lithuanian Football Cup: 2012–13, 2013–14
 Lithuanian Supercup: 2013

Individual
 Coach of the Year in Lithuania: 2014

References

External links

 Marek Zub official website at marekzub.pl (English) (French) (Polish) (Russian)
 
 Interview with Marek Zub at weszlo.com (Polish)

1964 births
Living people
People from Tomaszów Lubelski
Sportspeople from Lublin Voivodeship
Polish footballers
Polish expatriate footballers
Expatriate footballers in Belgium
Polish expatriate sportspeople in Belgium
Igloopol Dębica players
Polonia Warsaw players
Association football defenders
Polish football managers
Polish expatriate football managers
Polish expatriate sportspeople in Lithuania
Polish expatriate sportspeople in China
Polish expatriate sportspeople in Belarus
Polish expatriate sportspeople in Latvia
Expatriate football managers in Lithuania
Expatriate football managers in China
Expatriate football managers in Belarus
Expatriate football managers in Latvia
FK Žalgiris managers
GKS Bełchatów managers
Widzew Łódź managers
FC Shakhtyor Soligorsk managers
FC Tobol managers